Superslide may refer to:

Superslide (film), a roll film format 36x36mm to 40x40mm 
Kenosee Superslides, a water park in Saskatchewan, Canada

See also
 Superside (company), a subscription design service